Listed below are the dates and results for the 1978 FIFA World Cup qualification rounds for the South American Zone (CONMEBOL). For an overview of the qualification rounds, see the article 1978 FIFA World Cup qualification.

A total of 10 CONMEBOL teams entered the competition. The South American zone was allocated 3.5 places (out of 16) in the final tournament. Argentina, the hosts, qualified automatically, leaving 2.5 spots open for competition between 9 teams.

Format
There would be two rounds of play:
 First Round: The 9 teams were divided into 3 groups of 3 teams each. The teams would play against each other on a home-and-away basis. The group winners would advance to the Final Round.
 Final Round: The 3 teams would play against each other once in a neutral venue. The group winner and runner-up would qualify. The third-placed team would advance to the UEFA / CONMEBOL Intercontinental Play-off.

First round

Group 1

Brazil advanced to the Final Round.

Group 2

Bolivia advanced to the Final Round.

Group 3

Peru advanced to the Final Round.

Final round

Brazil and Peru qualified.
Bolivia advanced to the UEFA / CONMEBOL Intercontinental Play-off.

Inter-confederation play-offs

Qualified teams
The following three teams from CONMEBOL qualified for the final tournament.

1 Bold indicates champions for that year. Italic indicates hosts for that year.

Goalscorers

5 goals

 Zico

4 goals

 Roberto Dinamite
 Juan Carlos Oblitas

3 goals

 Miguel Aguilar
 Carlos Aragonés
 Porfirio Jiménez
 José Velásquez

2 goals

 Gilberto Alves
 Marinho Chagas
 Elías Figueroa
 Carlos Jara Saguier
 Teófilo Cubillas
 Dario Pereyra
 Nitder Pizzani

1 goal

 Oviedo Mezza
 Toninho Cerezo
 Marcelo Oliveira
 Roberto Rivellino
 Sergio Ahumada
 Osvaldo Castro
 Miguel Ángel Gamboa
 Eduardo Vilarete
 José Fabián Paz y Miño
 Carlos José Báez
 Alejandro Luces
 Juan José Muñante
 Percy Rojas
 Hugo Sotil
 Washington Oliveira
 Vicente Flores
 Rafael Iriarte

1 own goal

 Windsor del Llano (playing against Hungary)
 José Domingo Insfrán (playing against Brazil)

See also
1978 FIFA World Cup qualification
1978 FIFA World Cup qualification (UEFA)
1978 FIFA World Cup qualification (CONCACAF)
1978 FIFA World Cup qualification (CAF)
1978 FIFA World Cup qualification (AFC and OFC)

External links
 1978 FIFA World Cup qualification (CONMEBOL) at FIFA.com

CONMEBOL
FIFA World Cup qualification (CONMEBOL)
World